Häkkänen is a Finnish surname. Notable people with the surname include:

Juha Häkkänen (born 1945), Finnish actor
 Helinä Häkkänen-Nyholm (born 1971), Finnish psychologist
 Antti Häkkänen (born 1985), Finnish politician

Finnish-language surnames